Patagonian Welsh (Welsh: Cymraeg y Wladfa) is a variety of the Welsh language spoken in Y Wladfa, the Welsh settlement in Patagonia, Chubut Province, Argentina. The decimal numeral system used in Modern Welsh originated in Patagonia in the 1870s, and was subsequently adopted in Wales in the 1940s as a simpler counterpart to the traditional vigesimal system, which still survives in Wales.

Teachers are sent to teach the language and to train local tutors in the Welsh language, and there is some prestige in knowing the language, even among those  not of Welsh descent. Welsh education and projects are mainly funded by the Welsh Government, British Council, Cardiff University and the Welsh–Argentine Association. In 2005 there were 62 Welsh classes in the area and Welsh was taught as a subject in two primary schools and two colleges in the region of Gaiman. There is also a bilingual Welsh–Spanish language school called Ysgol yr Hendre situated in Trelew and a college located in Esquel. In 2016 there were three bilingual Welsh–Spanish primary schools in Patagonia.

Patagonian Welsh has developed to be a distinct dialect of Welsh, different from the several dialects used in Wales itself; however, the dialects have a high degree of mutual intelligibility, and speakers from Wales and Patagonia are able to communicate readily. Numerous toponyms throughout the Chubut Valley are of Welsh origin.

A total of 1,220 people undertook Welsh courses in Patagonia in 2015.

The formal Eisteddfod poetry competitions have been revived, although they are now bilingual in Welsh and Spanish.

History 

The Welsh people first arrived in Patagonia in 1865. They had migrated to protect their native Welsh culture and language, which they considered to be threatened in their native Wales. Over the years the use of the language started to decrease and there was relatively little contact between Wales and the Chubut Valley. The situation began to change when many Welsh people visited the region in 1965 to celebrate the colony's centenary; since then the number of Welsh visitors increased.

In 1945 and 1946 the BBC World Service broadcast radio shows in Patagonian Welsh.

During the 1982 repatriation of Argentine troops from the Falklands war, some Welsh Guardsmen encountered Welsh-speaking Argentine soldiers. The detained troops were disembarked at Puerto Madryn.

In 2004 the Welsh speakers in Argentina asked the Welsh government to provide them with Welsh TV programmes to encourage the survival and growth of Welsh in Patagonia.

Language uses

Language teaching nowadays 

Around 2005, 62 Welsh classes were taught in Chubut and language was also on the curriculum of a kindergarten, two primary schools and two schools in the area of Gaiman (including a school dating from 1899), as well as a bilingual Welsh-Spanish school located in Trelew and a school in Esquel. Welsh classes in the  Andes region have been held since 1996. The Welsh Institute of Trevelin and Esquel was born from a joint project of the Assembly of Wales, the British Council and the Government of the Province of Chubut.

Since the late 1990s, the Wales-Argentina Association has run a program to increase the teaching and use of the Welsh language in Chubut. For 15 years, the plan succeeded in creating a new type of Welsh-speakers in Patagonia (Welsh speakers as a second language, mostly young). By 1997, most of the students were adults and there was only one school for children. Four years later, there were 263 hours of Welsh classes per week and 846 students, of whom 87% were children and young people (in Gaiman, 95% of those attending such classes were under the age of twenty).

One of the functions of the Wales-Argentina Association is also to organize teacher and student exchange trips between Wales and Argentina: it has a representative on the British Council's Welsh Teaching Project Commission which has sent Welsh teachers to Chubut and financially supports a student attending an intensive Welsh language course held annually. It also has links with colleges and schools in both Wales and Chubut, where it subsidizes and provides support to students.

In May 2015, the local government of Trelew announced free intensive Welsh language classes for the city's inhabitants under the name of Cwrs Blasu ("Savoring the language"). Ann-Marie Lewis, a Welsh teacher, traveled to Patagonia exclusively to teach the language.

Welsh-Spanish bilingual schools 
For the 150th anniversary of the colony, an association was created in Trevelin to form the first Spanish-Welsh bilingual school in the 16 de Octubre valley under the name of Ysgol Gymraeg yr Andes, which will be public, but privately managed.

Literature and journalism 

Poetry and literature books have been published since the early years of the colony, while the first newspapers, such as the Y Drafod (bilingual Welsh-Spanish) date from the 1890s.

Perhaps one of the main writers of the colony was Eluned Morgan, author of several books, such as Into the Andes (in Welsh: Dringo 'r Andes) are considered classics. While R. Bryn Williams, was another prominent writer, who won the presidency of the National Eisteddfod and was also the author of several novels, including Banddos de los Andes. Among the writers in recent times, the figure of Irma Hughes de Jones can be observed.

Several volumes of memoirs on Patagonia have been published, including Memorias de la Patagonia (1980) by R. Bryn Williams, which includes essays by many residents of the Colonia, Atracciones de la Patagonia (1984) by Mariano Elías, based on from interviews with Fred Green, Memories of Patagonia (1985) by Valmai Jones and Nel fach and bwcs (1992) by Margaret Lloyd Jones. Meanwhile, Sian Eirian Rees Davies won the Daniel Owen Memorial Prize in 2005 with I Fyd Sy Well, a historical novel about the beginnings of the colony in Patagonia. Many extant books about the colony are in both Spanish and Welsh.

Eisteddfod 

The Eisteddfod is a very popular musical literary festival in Wales. With the arrival of settlers in Argentina, the festival also began in the region, which is celebrated twice a year until today. In September the Eisteddfod for young people is held in Gaiman and in October for adults. Also, they are made in Trevelin, Dolavon and Puerto Madryn.  Competitions are conducted in both Welsh and Spanish.

Vocabulary
The dialect contains local adoptions from Spanish or borrowings from English, not present in the Welsh spoken in Wales.

Gallery

Welsh toponymy of Patagonian sites 

When the Welsh settlers arrived in Patagonia, they did not have immediate contact with the Tehuelche or Mapuche natives, who already had their own toponymy for the region. Because of this, they needed to somehow distinguish the landscapes of their new home.

Puerto Madryn was the first Welsh toponym. The name of the city commemorates Love Jones Parry, Baron of Madryn in Wales. The place name originated towards the end of 1862, when Love Jones Parry, accompanied by Lewis Jones traveled to Patagonia aboard the Candelaria ship to decide if that region was suitable for a Welsh colony.

In the Chubut river valley, some of the toponyms of villages and rural areas arose from the peculiarities of the terrain (such as Bryn Gwyn, "white hill", or Tyr Halen, "salt land"), from the names of the farms donated by the Argentine government, or by a chapel erected in the area (as in the case of Bethesda or Ebenezer). 

There are also tributes to people, such as Trelew, where "Lew" is an acronym for Lewis Jones; or compound names derived from geographical features (for example, Dolavon, where “Dol” is meadow or lap and “avon”, river) or even from buildings (such as Trevelin, where “Tre” is town and “velin”, mill, for John Daniel Evans' flour mill).

Some naming performed by the Welsh survive and others have been lost. In 2015 a project called Gorsedd y Cwmwl emerged, aimed at restoring the original name of the Trono de las Nubes hill given by the first Welsh people who inhabited the 16 de Octubre valley and forgotten by the population, since the mountain is also called «La Monja».

References

Languages of Argentina
Welsh settlement in Patagonia
Welsh dialects